The 1927 Missouri Tigers football team was an American football team that represented the University of Missouri as a member of the Missouri Valley Conference (MVC) during the 1927 college football season. The team compiled a overall record of 7–2 record with mark of 5–1 against conference opponents, won the MVC title, and outscored all opponents by a combined total of 129 to 90. Gwinn Henry was the head coach for the fifth of nine seasons. The team played its home games at Memorial Stadium in Columbia, Missouri.

Schedule

References

Missouri
Missouri Tigers football seasons
Missouri Valley Conference football champion seasons
Missouri Tigers football